The Aurora Awards are granted annually by the Canadian SF and Fantasy Association and SFSF Boreal Inc. The Award for Best Visual Presentation was first awarded in 2016. Previously film and television works had been under the Best Related Work category, and several TV show episodes had won that award. The French-language equivalent is given in the Best Audio, Visual and Artistic Creation category, which doesn't have a direct English-language equivalent.

Like the other categories in the Aurora Awards, only Canadians are credited, and so only the Canadian directors or production companies that work on the films and television series are recognized.

Winners and nominees

  *   Winners and joint winners

References

Aurora Awards